Norayr Gyozalyan (born 15 March 1990) is an Armenian professional football player, most recently playing for Artsakh of the Armenian Premier League.

External links
 
 Profile at pressball.by

1990 births
Living people
Armenian footballers
Association football forwards
Armenian expatriate footballers
Expatriate footballers in Belarus
Armenian Premier League players
FC Impuls Dilijan players
FC Torpedo-BelAZ Zhodino players
FC Urartu players
FC Alashkert players
FC Noah players